Ross Perkins (born November 4, 1946) is a Canadian retired professional ice hockey forward.  He played 225 games in the World Hockey Association with the Edmonton Oilers.

External links
 

1946 births
Living people
Canadian ice hockey centres
Edmonton Oilers (WHA) players
Ice hockey people from Saskatchewan
People from Tisdale, Saskatchewan
20th-century Canadian people